Thomas Bennett (October 15, 1788 – February 12, 1872) was a magistrate and political figure in Newfoundland.

Born in Shaftesbury, Dorsetshire, England, Bennett first worked for the British government in the Commissariat Department and moved to St. John's, Newfoundland, in the early 1820s to work in his brother Charles' mercantile business. Both brothers became important members of the business community and his brother later served as Premier of Newfoundland.

In 1828, Bennett married Hannah Hutchings.

He entered politics in 1832 running for House of Assembly for Twillingate and Fogo. He became Speaker of the House of Assembly in 1834 opposing William Carson as a conservative supporter and remained as speaker until 1837 when he did not run for election. Bennett also held a number of appointed positions in the government after he chose not to run for further office. He was chosen for these appointments because the governor, Sir John Harvey, wanted both brothers to be part of the newly formed government.

Bennett remained active in politics until he was appointed as a stipendiary magistrate, remaining in that post until his retirement in 1870. In 1870, after his brother Charles became Premier of Newfoundland, Thomas returned to England. He died in Shaftesbury at the age of 83.

References 
Encyclopedia of Newfoundland and Labrador, volume 1, Smallwood, Joseph Roberts, 1900-, Pitt, Robert D. W., 1953-, Newfoundland Book Publishers (1967) Ltd., St. John's, 1981

External links 
Biography at the Dictionary of Canadian Biography Online

Speakers of the Newfoundland and Labrador House of Assembly
1788 births
1872 deaths
Newfoundland Colony judges
People from Shaftesbury
English emigrants to pre-Confederation Newfoundland